Morris L. Goodman (ca. 1818-1888) was the first Jewish Los Angeles City Council member.

Career
Goodman was elected to the Los Angeles Common Council in 1850 and was the only American citizen on that body as well as the only Jew. 

He was a Los Angeles council member from 1850 to 1854, after which he became a deputy sheriff and served in the San Fernando Valley. Goodman began a term on the Los Angeles County Board of Supervisors in January 1861, but resigned after five months.

In 1872, he opened up a dry goods business in partnership with Theodore Rimpau, in Anaheim, California.

Biography
Goodman was a member of Masonic lodge No. 42. He was also a member of the Central Committee of the local Democratic Party.

Goodman moved from Los Angeles to Anaheim, where he was a City Council member for a "number of years." He died there on January 23, 1888, at age 69 or 70.

References

Resources
"Holidays in the Valley: The Jewish Experience Immigration". David Silver. Los Angeles Times, November 29, 1991.

American Jews
American deputy sheriffs
Los Angeles Common Council (1850–1889) members
County supervisors in California
19th-century American people